The NWA Continental Heavyweight Championship was a major title in the National Wrestling Alliance's Alabama territory called Southeastern Championship Wrestling. It existed from 1984 until 1988 when SECW became the Continental Wrestling Federation. The title continued on as the CWF Heavyweight Championship from 1988 until 1989 when the CWF closed.

Footnotes

See also
National Wrestling Alliance
Southeast Championship Wrestling

References

National Wrestling Alliance championships
Continental Championship Wrestling championships
Heavyweight wrestling championships